The Midea China Classic is a professional golf tournament held in China. It was first played in 2007 at the Royal Orchid International Golf Club in Guangzhou. The tournament was originally part of the Asian Tour schedule, but became part of the rival OneAsia Tour for its inaugural season in 2009.

Winners

Notes

External links
Official site 

Former Asian Tour events
Golf tournaments in China